Romania participated at the 2017 Summer Universiade, in Taipei, Taiwan.

Medalists

Medal by sports

References

External links
Universiade Taipei 2017

Nations at the 2017 Summer Universiade
Romania at the Summer Universiade
2017 in Romanian sport